Ma Yashu (born 24 March 1977) is a Chinese actress best known for her roles as Bai Lianhua and He Xiaoxi in the television series Journey to the West (2000) and The Story of Parents House (2008) respectively.

Early life and education
Ma was born in Kunming, Yunnan on March 24, 1977. In 1986 she was accepted to the National Academy of Chinese Theatre Arts.

Acting career
Ma made her film debut in Beijing Girl (1989), playing Jin Jing.

In 1995, Ma made her television debut in Legendary Life.

In 1996, she had a minor role as Bi Zhu in The Greatness of a Hero, which starred Sun Chengzheng as Di Renjie. That same year, she had a cameo appearance in the historical television series Heroes in Sui and Tang Dynasties, a television series adaptation based on the novel of the same name.

Ma starred in a television series called Journey to the West with Cao Rong, Huang Haibing, and Wu Jian. It is a sequel to Journey to the West.

In 2002 she co-starred with Nicky Wu and Athena Chu in the wuxia television series Treasure Raiders, adapted from Taiwanese novelist Gu Long's novel of the same title.

Ma had a supporting role in Fate in Tears and Laughter (2004), based on the novel by the same name by Zhang Henshui. She played a supporting role in Heroes on a Silk Road, starring Nicky Wu and Theresa Lee and directed by Chin Siu-ho.

In 2005, she appeared in The Legend of Hero, a Taiwanese television series adapted from the Hong Kong manhua series Chinese Hero: Tales of the Blood Sword by Ma Wing-shing. It was produced by Young Pei-pei and starred Peter Ho and Ady An in the leading roles. She starred with Nicky Wu, Chin Siu-ho and Alex To in Iron Fisted Drifter. She also appeared in Girls' Dairy, opposite Yang Zi.

Ma was cast as Zhao Yuhua in Prince to Pauper (2007), opposite Du Chun and Hawick Lau.

In 2008, she played the female lead role in Medic, alongside Deng Chao and Li Xiaoran. She starred as Chun Tao, reuniting her with co-star Jia Nailiang, who played her lover, in the TV drama Chun Tao's War. She appeared in The Story of Parents House. She continued in the role in the 2011 television series The Story of Parents House 3, and 2016's The Story of Parents House 4.

Ma played Liu Qizhen, the lead role in He Liping's romantic television series Who Knows the Female of the Women (2010), costarring Hawick Lau. She co-starred with Chen Sicheng in Pretty Maid.

In 2012, Ma had a lead role in the TV drama, Lock Dream.

Ma took the lead role in the 2018 romantic comedy television series Nice to Meet You, alongside Zhang Ming'en, Wen Yongshan, Wei Qianxiang and Tang Mengjia.

In 2019, it was reported that Ma was in talks to appear in the television series adaption of Jin Yong's wuxia novel Demi-Gods and Semi-Devils which will be directed by Yu Rongguang.

Personal life
Ma was married to Nicky Wu in December 2006. They first met while appearing in a Chinese television series Treasure Raiders in 2001. They divorced on August 11, 2009.

After a turbulent divorce, she remarried on June 27, 2010. Her husband named James Robert Hayes. The couple has a daughter named Mia and a son named Aiden. She has a stepdaughter named Atina Robert.

Filmography

Film

Television

References

External links

1977 births
People from Kunming
Living people
Hui actresses
National Academy of Chinese Theatre Arts alumni
Chinese film actresses
Chinese television actresses
Middle School Affiliated to the National Academy of Chinese Theatre Arts alumni